Carballo is one of 54 parishes in Cangas del Narcea, a municipality within the province and autonomous community of Asturias, in northern Spain.

Villages
 Carbachu
 Curveiru
 Las Tiendas
 Tremáu Carbachu

Parishes in Cangas del Narcea